Dawn Squires (born 1949) is an English born, former Swaziland international lawn bowler.

Bowls career
Squires has represented Swaziland at two Commonwealth Games; at the 1998 Commonwealth Games and the 2006 Commonwealth Games.

She won a triples silver medal at the 1999 Atlantic Bowls Championships in Cape Town, South Africa.

Personal life
She lived in Malkerns and is a company Director by trade.

References

Living people
Bowls players at the 1998 Commonwealth Games
Bowls players at the 2006 Commonwealth Games
1949 births
Swazi bowls players